The 2008 TENNIS.com Zurich Open was a women's tennis tournament played on indoor hard courts. It was the 25th edition of the event known that year as the TENNIS.com Zurich Open, and was part of the Tier II Series of the 2008 WTA Tour. It took place at the Hallenstadion in Zürich, Switzerland, from 11 October through 19 October 2008. Venus Williams won the singles title.

Finals

Singles

 Venus Williams defeated  Flavia Pennetta, 7–6(7–1), 6–2
It was Venus Williams' 2nd title of the year, and her 38th overall. It was her 2nd win at the event.

Doubles

 Cara Black /  Liezel Huber defeated  Anna-Lena Grönefeld /  Patty Schnyder, 6–1, 7–6(7–3)

External links

Official website
WTA tournament draws

Zurich Open
2008
2008 in Swiss tennis
2008 in Swiss women's sport